The Hoher Prijakt ("High Prijakt") and Niederer Prijakt ("Low Prijakt") are a prominent double summit which, seen from the west and north, form one of the most attractively-shaped mountains of the Schober Group in the state of Tyrol in western Austria. The summit cross was placed on the lower Niederer Prijakt which is easier to see from the valley.

The easiest route to the Hoher Prijakt takes about three hours from the Hochschober Hut heading for the Mirnitzscharte notch, later turning north and heading past the lake of Barrenlesee until just below the western Barreneckscharte notch and finally making its way along the unchallenging eastern arête to the summit. The route is waymarked and free of snow and ice in the summer, but does require sure-footedness.

The crossing of the linking ridge takes about 30 minutes and is rated as grade II, but the difficulty is somewhat reduced by protective steel cables. The Niederer Prijakt can alternatively also be ascended on a climbing route,  that is not too difficult, from the Mirschachscharte notch along the southwestern arête.

Literature and maps 
 Alpine Club map Sheet 41, 1:25,000 series, Schobergruppe, 
 Richard Goedeke: 3000er in den Nordalpen, Bruckmann, Munich, 2004, 
 Georg Zlöbl: Die Dreitausender Osttirols im Nationalpark Hohe Tauern, Verlag Grafik Zloebl, 2005, 
 Walter Mair: Alpenvereinsführer Schobergruppe. Bergverlag Rudolf Rother, Munich, 1979.

References

External links 

 www.thehighrisepages.de Tour 490 – Hochschober, Kleinschober, Niederer Prijakt, Hoher Prijakt

Alpine three-thousanders
Mountains of the Alps
Mountains of Tyrol (state)
Geography of East Tyrol
Schober Group